Bauwaki (Bawaki) is a Papuan language of New Guinea, sometimes classified as a member of the Mailuan family. It is 70% lexically similar to Abia of the Yareban family. Dutton (1971) proposed it to be a 'bridge' between the Mailuan and Yareban language families.  O'oku, either a dialect or a closely related language, is similarly lexically 60% Yareban.

References

Languages of Papua New Guinea
Mailuan languages
Mailu–Yareban languages